In inorganic chemistry, titanyl refers to the functional group TiIVO, sometimes written TiO2+. The term titanyl is used loosely to describe many titanium(IV) oxide compounds and complexes.  For example, titanyl sulfate and potassium titanyl phosphate contain TiIVO centers with the connectivity O-Ti-O-Ti.  In heterogeneous catalysis, titanyl refers to a terminal oxo ligand on a surface titanium(IV) center. There are a few molecular titanyl complexes where the oxo ligand is terminal, not bridging. In these cases the titanyl group is described as having a triple bond, i.e., Ti≡O.

References

Titanium compounds